The Ignis Brunensis is an international firework competition held annually at the end of May and beginning of June in Brno, Czech Republic. The name of competition is Latin for Fire of Brno.

Program

The event lasts about two weeks and involves the whole city of Brno. It is introduced by non-competitive fireworks launched from the city centre. From this moment competing fireworks are presented outside the city centre on the nearby Brno Dam where the effect is increased by reflection from the water. Each fireworks show lasts about 22 minutes, with synchronized music broadcast by the local radio station. Shows are held one by one every Wednesday and Saturday. The event attracts from 100,000 to 200,000 visitors The closing ceremony again includes non-competing fireworks launched from the city centre. Local museums, castles and other institutions also participate in the event, with their own programmes.

History

Ignis Brunensis started in 1998. Until 2002 it was either a national fireworks competition (1998, 2000, 2002) or a non-competitive exhibition (1999, 2001). Since 2003 it has been a significant international competition, with 4 or 5 competing entries.

Winners

Notes

External links 

 Official website

Fireworks competitions
Annual events in the Czech Republic
Brno
1998 establishments in the Czech Republic
Recurring events established in 1998